ECU-TEST is a software tool developed by TraceTronic GmbH, based in Dresden, Germany, for test and validation of embedded systems. Since the first release of ECU-TEST in 2003, the software is used as standard tool in the development of automotive ECUs and increasingly in the development of heavy machinery as well as in factory automation. The development of the software started within a research project on systematic testing of control units and laid the foundation for the spin-off of TraceTronic GmbH from TU Dresden.
ECU-TEST aims at the specification, implementation, documentation, execution and assessment of test cases. Owing to various test automation methods, the tool ensures an efficient implementation of all necessary activities for the creation, execution and assessment of test cases.

Functionality

Methodology 
ECU-TEST automates the control of the whole test environment and supports a broad range of test tools.
Various abstraction layers for measured quantities allow its application on different testing levels, e.g. within the context of model in the loop, software in the loop and hardware in the loop as well as in real systems (vehicle and driver in the loop).
Creating test cases using ECU-TEST is conducted graphically and does not require programming skills. Test-case descriptions have a generic form, which together with extensive parameterization and configuration options, allows uniform access to all test tools and thereby simplifies re-use of existing tests over multiple development phases.

Structure 
ECU-TEST is organized in four parts:
 Editor and Project manager
 Configurator
 Test engine
 Analyzer and Protocol generator
In order to create a test case, one or more sequences of test steps and their parameterizations are specified using the editor. Test steps comprise reading and evaluating measured quantities of the test object, manipulating the test environment as well as the execution of diagnostic functions and control structures. Multiple test cases can be organized using the project manager. Additional settings for test object and test environment can be made using the configurator. The execution of test cases is performed using a multi-stage test engine. The generated log data serve as the basis for the creation of test reports. Subsequent to the test execution, optional checks of recorded measured quantities are performed in the analyzer. From the results of test-execution and subsequent checks, the protocol generator produces a detailed test report, which is displayed interactively and can be archived in files and data bases.

Interfaces 
ECU-TEST provided clear interfaces for extensions and for the integration in existing test and validation processes. A large amount of test hardware and software is supported by default. Using user-defined test steps, plug-ins and Python scripts, additional tools can be integrated with little effort. Via a specific client-server-architecture, software tools of multiple test-bench computers in distributed test environments can be addressed. Using a COM interface, further tools, e.g. for requirements management, revision control and model-based testing can be integrated. ECU-TEST supports the following hardware and software tools and is based on the following standards:

Supported hardware and software 

 A&D: iTest
 AKKA: Gigabox
 ASAM: ACI
 ASAM: XiL
 ASAP: STEP
 ATI: VISION
 AVL: LYNX
 AVSimulation: SCANeR
 Beckhoff: TwinCAT
 BMW: EDIABAS
 CARLA Team: CARLA
 Digitalwerk: ADTF
 Digitec: MGB
 dSPACE: ControlDesk
 dSPACE: ModelDesk
 dSPACE: MotionDesk
 dSPACE: RTMaps
 EA: UTA12
 ESI: SimulationX
 ETAS: BOA
 ETAS: COSYM SIL
 ETAS: INCA
 ETAS: LABCAR
 ETAS: LABCAR-PINCONTROL
 FEP
 FEP3
 FEV: Morphée
 froglogic:Squish
 Google: ADB
 Göpel: Video Dragon
 HORIBA FuelCon: TestWork
 HMS: ACT - Restbussimulation
 HMS: Bus interfaces
 IDS: uEye
 IPG: CarMaker
 JS Foundation: Appium
 KS Engineers: Tornado
Lauterbach: TRACE32
MAGNA: BluePiraT
Mathworks: MATLAB® & Simulink
 Mechanical Simulation Corporation: CarSim
 MicroNova: NovaCarts
 Modelica Association: FMI
National Instruments: LabVIEW
National Instruments: VeriStand
National Instruments: VISA
 OPAL-RT: RT-LAB
 PEAK: PCAN
 PLS: UDE
 QUANCOM: QLIB
 RA Consulting: DiagRA D
 ROS2
 SAE: PassThru
 Scienlab: Charging Discovery System
 Scienlab: Energy Storage Discover
 Selenium
 Softing: CAN L2 API
 Softing: Diagnostic Tool Set
 Speedgoat: Simulink RT
Synopsys: Silver
Synopsys: SilverXIL
Synopsys: Virtualizer
Technica: BTS
 The GNU Project: GDB
 TraceTronic: Ethernet
 TraceTronic: Multimedia
 TraceTronic: RemoteCommand
 TraceTronic: Serial interface
 TraceTronic: SSH MultiConnect
 TTTech: TTXConnexion
Typhoon HIL: Typhoon HIL Control Center
Vector: CANalyzer
Vector: CANape
Vector: CANoe
Vector: DYNA4
Vector XL API
 ViGEM: Car Communication Analyzer
 Vires: Virtual Test Drive
 VW: ODIS
 X2E: Xoraya

Test management tools 

 Broadcom Rally Software
IBM RQM
Micro Focus ALM /HP Quality Center
 Micro Focus Octane
PTC Integrity LifeCycle Manager
 SIEMENS Polarion ALM

Source code management tools 

 Apache Subversion
 Git

System requirements 

 OS: Windows 10, 64 bit
 Free hard disk capacity: at least 3 GB
 RAM: at least 2 GB
 Screen resolution: at least 1200 x 800 pixel

References

External links 
 ECU-TEST product page on TraceTronic website. Retrieved 05 February 2020.
 TraceTronic GmbH. Retrieved 05 February 2020.

Automotive electronics
Computer-aided engineering software
Control engineering
Data analysis software
Software testing tools